Nancy Fitz (born January 24, 1967) is an American former rugby union player.

She was captain and coach for the D.C. Furies.

References

External links 
 Eagles profile
 

Living people
American female rugby union players
United States women's international rugby union players
World Rugby Hall of Fame inductees
1967 births
21st-century American women